The Guards Mixed Brigade was a military unit of the Imperial Japanese Army.

History
In September 1939 the 1st Guards Brigade of the Japanese Imperial Guards Division was split off and transferred to South China to become known as the Guards Mixed Brigade.

The Mixed Brigade took with it the 1st and 2nd Guards Infantry Regiments, the Guards Cavalry Regiment, and about half of the other support and service units. There it defended against the Chinese 1939-40 winter offensive and participated in the later part of the Battle of South Guangxi.

In October 1940, the Guards Mixed Brigade joined other Japanese units occupying French Indochina. In April 1941 it returned to Tokyo, but did not re-join the Imperial Guards Division.

In June 1943 the 1st Guards Division (Imperial Japanese Army) was formed from the Guards Mixed Brigade in Tokyo.

Organization 
Structure of the division in 1941:

 Headquarters
 Guards Regiment
 3rd Guards Regiment
 4th Guards Regiment
 5th Guards Regiment
 Guards Field Artillery Regiment
 Guards Reconnaissance Regiment
 Guards Engineer Regiment
 Guards Transport Regiment

See also
Imperial Guard (Japan)
List of IJA Mixed Brigades

References 

Japanese World War II brigades
Military units and formations established in 1939
Military units and formations disestablished in 1941